Jovan Branković (c. 1465 – 10 December 1502) was the titular Despot of Serbia from 1493 until his death in 1502. The title of despot was given to him by Hungarian king Vladislas II of Hungary. From 1493 to 1497 he held the title together with his elder brother Đorđe Branković, who was despot from 1486. In 1497, Đorđe relinquished the title, and Jovan remained the sole Despot of Serbia, until his death in 1502. Jovan was the last Serbian Despot of the Branković dynasty. With his brother he built the Krušedol monastery, and made various donations to Hilandar and other Eastern Orthodox monasteries. He was proclaimed a saint by the Serbian Orthodox Church.

Life
Jovan was the younger son of Stefan Branković, exiled Despot of Serbia (1458–1459), and Princess Angelina Arianites. He was born c. 1465, while his parents were residing in the Castle Belgrado, in the region of Friuli. His father, Despot Stefan, died in 1476 while family was still living in Belgrado. In 1479, Emperor Friedrich III granted them Castle Weitensfeld in Carinthia, and Jovan moved there with the rest of family.

Jovan's cousin Vuk Branković, titular Despot of Serbia, died in 1485, without direct heirs. His title and estates in the Kingdom of Hungary were left vacant, prompting Hungarian king Matthias Corvinus to find a suitable heir. He opted for the only remaining male members of Branković family (Đorđe and Jovan), inviting them to come to Hungary.

In 1486, they arrived in Hungary, and Jovan's elder brother Đorđe received the title of Despot of Serbia from King Matthias, who granted them possessions in Kupinik, Slankamen, and Berkasovo in the region of Syrmia.

From 1493 forwards, the brothers ruled jointly, since Jovan was also granted the title Despot of Serbia, as it was customary in the Kingdom of Hungary that various senior posts be held jointly by two incumbents.

In 1497, Đorđe decided to relinquish all of his titles and possessions to Jovan. At that time, Đorđe took monastic vows, adopting the name Maksim. The brothers later built the Krušedol monastery in the region of Syrmia.

Jovan had different goals to those of his brother Đorđe. He did not seek to create a heavenly realm, but sought to defeat the Turks and drive them out of his lands, and as such to be entitled the ranks of his ancestors. He successfully fought the Ottoman Empire during several operations in Bosnia, especially around Zvornik. Jovan also planned to free the Serbs from Ottoman rule with the help of the Republic of Venice, but this was prevented by his death in 1502. After his death, the hope of restoring Serbia under the advancing Ottoman Empire became weaker.

He married a Serbian noblewoman Jelena Jakšić, with whom he had several children, but no surviving male heir. After his death in 1502, Hungarian king Vladislaus II (d. 1516) instructed Jovan's widow Jelena to remarry (1504) to a prominent nobleman, Ivaniš Berislavić (d. 1514) from Požega County. Subsequently, Berislavić was granted the title Despot of Serbia and control over Branković family estates.

Jovan is mentioned in the "Dell'Imperadori Constantinopolitani", or Massarelli manuscript, found in the papers of Angelo Massarelli (1510–1566).

Sainthood

Members of the Branković dynasty were known for their devotion to Eastern Orthodox Christianity, and Jovan Branković also represented that family tradition. His cult began in the first half of the 16th century. He was buried at the Krušedol monastery, and laid together with the rest of his family members, in coffins at the altar. During the Austro-Turkish War (1716–1718), a Turkish army invaded Syrmia in 1716, captured Krušedol monastery and burned the holy relics, shortly after the Battle of Petrovaradin. Only some minor parts of the relics were preserved.

Family
He married Serbian noblewoman Jelena Jakšić, who is mentioned as "Helena, Serbiæ despotissa" in a charted dated to 1502. They had 4 children, all of whom were daughters:

 Marija, married to Ferdinand Frankopan, of the House of Frankopan
 Jelena, married to Peter IV Rareş, Prince of Moldavia
 Ana, married to Fiodor Sanguszko, Marshal of Volhynia
 Marija Magdalena, married to Iwan Wiśniowiecki, a noble from Volhynia

Some researchers have suggested, after taking into account the dates of Jelena's both marriages (first with Jovan Branković, and second with Ivaniš Berislavić), that some of her daughters who are usually considered to be from her first marriage, might in fact be from her second marriage.

Some genealogies also indicate that another daughter, Milica Despina, married Neagoe Basarab, Prince of Wallachia (1512–21). Some believe Milica was too old to be his daughter, but she was born cca. 1486–1488. Milica Despina might have been an illegitimate daughter of his or other close relative or even the daughter of Jovan's brother Đorđe with whom she went to Wallachia in 1503.

References

Sources

 
 
 
 
 
 
 
 
 
 
 
 
 
 

15th-century Serbian monarchs
16th-century Serbian monarchs
15th-century Serbian royalty
16th-century Serbian royalty
Jovan
Despots of Serbia
15th-century births
1502 deaths
Eastern Orthodox royal saints